Schleck is a surname, and may refer to a family of Luxembourgian  professional road bicycle racers :
 Johny Schleck (born 1942)
and his two sons :
 Andy Schleck (born 1985)
 Fränk Schleck (born 1980)

Other
Charles Asa Schleck, American catholic prelate
Schleck is the German for licking